Adji Bousso Dieng is a Senegalese Computer Scientist and Statistician working in the field of Artificial Intelligence. Her research bridges probabilistic graphical models and deep learning to discover meaningful structure from unlabelled data. She is currently an Artificial Intelligence Research Scientist at Google Brain in Mountain View, California. In 2021, she will start her tenure-track faculty position at Princeton University becoming the first Black female faculty member in the School of Engineering and Applied Science as well as the first Black faculty member ever in the Department of Computer Science.  Dieng recently founded the non-profit “The Africa I Know” (TAIK) with the goal to inspire young Africans to pursue careers in STEM and AI by showcasing African role models, informing the general public about developments in STEM and AI by Africans, and educating the general public about the rich history of Africa.

Early life and education 
Dieng was born and raised in Kaolack, Senegal. Her father never attended school, and her mother started but did not complete high school. Dieng was one of 15 siblings, and to support the family, her parents owned a business selling fabric. Her father passed away when she was four years old, yet her mother still ensured that education was a priority in the family. Dieng attended Kaolack's public schools for both elementary and high school.

During high school, Dieng was recognized for her academic achievements. She won one of the prizes for the Senegalese Olympiad ("Concours Général") in Philosophy, was selected to participate in the 2005 Excellence camp organized by the Pathfinder Foundation for Education and Development, a non-profit founded by Cheick Modibo Diarra, and was subsequently selected to participate in a competitive exam organized for African girls in partnership between the Central Bank for West African States and the Pathfinder Foundation. She received a scholarship to study abroad after winning this competition.

While abroad, Dieng attended Lycée Henri IV, a public secondary school located in Paris. She then attended Télécom ParisTech, a top French public institution of higher education and research of engineering located in Palaiseau, France. Dieng spent her third year of Telecom ParisTech's curriculum at Cornell University. In 2013 she graduated from Télécom ParisTech, earning her Diplome d'ingenieur (a degree in Engineering from France's Grandes Ecoles system). She was also awarded a Master in Applied Statistics from Cornell University in Ithaca, New York.

After working at the World Bank for one year, Dieng started her PhD in Statistics at Columbia University. Dieng worked with David Blei and John Paisley to bridge Probabilistic Graphical Modeling and Deep Learning with the goal of discovering meaningful patterns from unlabelled data for applications in natural language processing, computer vision, and healthcare. Dieng's doctoral work has received various forms of recognition including the Google PhD Fellowship in Machine Learning, the Savage Award for Applied Methodology (the first Black woman to win this award since it was established in 1977), and a Rising Star in Machine Learning nomination by the University of Maryland. Dieng was also the second black woman to graduate from the department of Statistics at Columbia University.

Career and research 
Dieng is currently working at Google Brain as a Research Scientist in Artificial Intelligence (AI). Prior to her work at Google, Dieng interned at many major companies in AI such as Microsoft Research in Seattle, DeepMind in London, and she also worked with Yann LeCun at Facebook AI Research. In 2013, Dieng accepted a position as a Junior Professional Associate at the World Bank working on risk modeling in the Department of Market and Counterparty Risk. She left the World Bank the following summer, in 2014, after being awarded a Columbia University Dean Fellowship to start a PhD in Statistics.

In 2021, Dieng joined the Department of Computer Science at Princeton University as a tenure-track Assistant Professor. She is the first Black faculty in Computer Science in Princeton's history, the first Black woman tenure-track faculty in Princeton's School of Engineering, and the second Black woman tenure-track faculty in Computer Science across the Ivy League.

Dieng has authored/co-authored several papers published in AI venues such as NeurIPS, ICML, ICLR, AISTATS, and TACL.

Advocacy

The Africa I Know 
Dieng is the founder of the non-profit called “ The Africa I Know”, with the mission to positively change the narrative about Africa and provide opportunities to young Africans. Dieng noticed the inaccurate portrayal of Africa in the media, which was further accentuated during the COVID-19 global crisis. Another goal of the initiative is to provide role models to young Africans, who often grow up without seeing role models that look like them due to a lack of visibility. The majority of people do not know about the rich history of STEM and AI developments made possible by Africans. TAIK inspires young Africans to follow careers in STEM and AI, informs people about the contributions in STEM and AI by Africans, and educates about the rich history of Africa.

Awards and honors 

 2020 - Named one of the 100 Most Influential Young Africans
 2020 - Received the Savage Award, Applied Methodology, for her thesis "Deep Probabilistic Graphical Modeling"
 2019 - Rising Star in Machine Learning (University of Maryland)
 2019 - Google PhD Fellowship in Machine Learning 
 2016 - Microsoft Azure Research Award
 2014 - Columbia University Dean Fellowship
 2013 - Cornell Institute for African Development Fellowship
 2007 - Pathfinder Foundation Scholarship 
 2006 - Senegalese Government Excellence Scholarship
 2006 - Laureate du Concours General (Senegalese Olympiad, Philosophy)

Select publications 

 A. B. Dieng, F. J. R. Ruiz, and D. M. Blei. Topic Modeling in Embedding Spaces. Transactions of the Association for Computational Linguistics (TACL), 2020
 A. B. Dieng, Y. Kim, A. M. Rush, and D. M. Blei. Avoiding Latent Variable Collapse With Generative Skip Models. Artificial Intelligence and Statistics (AISTATS), 2019
 A. B. Dieng, R. Ranganath, J. Altosaar, and D. M. Blei. Noisin: Unbiased Regularization for Recurrent Neural Networks. International Conference on Machine Learning (ICML), 2018
 A. B. Dieng, C. Wang, J. Gao, and J. W. Paisley. TopicRNN: A Recurrent Neural Network with Long Range Semantic Dependency. International Conference on learning Representation (ICLR), 2017
 A. B. Dieng, D. Tran, R. Ranganath, J. W. Paisley and D. M. Blei. Variational Inference via χ Upper Bound Minimization. Neural Information Processing Systems (NIPS), 2017

References

External links 

Artificial intelligence researchers
Lycée Henri-IV alumni
Télécom Paris alumni
Cornell University alumni
Senegalese women computer scientists
Year of birth missing (living people)
Living people
21st-century non-fiction writers
Senegalese women writers
Women technology writers
Columbia University alumni